University of Giessen, official name Justus Liebig University Giessen, is a large public research university in Giessen, Hesse, Germany. It is named after its most famous faculty member, Justus von Liebig, the founder of modern agricultural chemistry and inventor of artificial fertiliser. It covers the areas of arts/humanities, business, dentistry, economics, law, medicine, science, social sciences, and veterinary medicine. Its university hospital, which has two sites, Giessen and Marburg (the latter of which is the teaching hospital of the University of Marburg), is the only private university hospital in Germany.

History
The University of Giessen is among the oldest institutions of higher educations in the German-speaking world. It was founded in 1607 as a Lutheran university in the city of Giessen in Hesse-Darmstadt because the all-Hessian Landesuniversität (the nearby University of Marburg (Philipps-Universität Marburg) in Marburg, Hesse-Kassel (or Hesse-Cassel)) had become Reformed (that is, Calvinist). Louis V, Landgrave of Hesse-Darmstadt, whence the university got its original name "Ludoviciana," founded his own institution of higher education in Giessen, which as a Lutheran institution had the primary function of ensuring the education of pastors and civil servants. Endowed with a charter issued by Rudolf II, Holy Roman Emperor, on 19 May 1607, the university was allowed to proceed with instruction in October 1607. During the Thirty Years' War, when Hesse-Darmstadt was able to take the area around Marburg for itself, the University of Giessen ceased instruction and was moved back to its more long-standing location in Marburg (1624/25). The Peace of Westphalia led to the restoration of the old location and in 1650 to the relocation of the university to Giessen.

In the 17th and 18th centuries the Ludoviciana was a typical small state university that then had the four common faculties (theology, law, medicine, and philosophy). The instruction was reasonable, with about 20 to 25 professors teaching several hundred students, the latter of which were mostly "Landeskinder." In the 18th century came gradual modernization of the curricula and reforms in the instruction, which were definitively influenced by the local lordly court in Darmstadt. The example for the reforms were both of the "model universities of the Enlightenment," the University of Halle, founded in 1694, and more still Georgia Augusta, founded in Göttingen in 1734/37. Indeed, all attempts at reform were from the start limited by the limited finances of Hesse-Darmstadt.

The noteworthy creation of a Faculty of Economics (1777–1785) was ultimately was born out of this financial hardship. In the Faculty of Economics, new practical subjects were brought together (veterinary medicine, forestry, and cameral sciences), which the university was supposed to make "expedient" and "profitable." (One of the earliest courses of study in forestry in Europe.) After finishing studies in this Faculty, a number of these youths were able to gain recognition in the Faculties of Medicine and Philosophy. They established the unusually diverse course offerings that continue to exist to the modern day at the University of Giessen.

The University of Giessen weathered the transition from the 18th to the 19th century unscathed and was still the only university of an enlarged territory, the Grand Duchy of Hesse. Alongside Jena, Giessen was the prototype for the politicized Vormärz university, and the "Giessener Schwarzen" with Karl Follen and Georg Büchner, marked the revolutionary spirit of this decade. With the appointment of the 21-year-old Justus von Liebig in 1824 through the Grand Duchy — against the will of the university on the recommendation of Alexander von Humboldt — a new era in the natural sciences began, not only in Giessen. Young, promising scientists created a new impulse in their respective areas of knowledge; among these scientists were the antiquarian Friedrich Gottlieb Welcker, the lawyer Rudolf von Jhering, the theologian Adolf von Harnack, the mathematician Moritz Pasch and the physicist Wilhelm Conrad Röntgen.

At the turn of the 20th century, the Ludoviciana began to expand into a modern university. During this period, new clinics in human and veterinary medicine were established, and the university library received its first proper building. With the creation of the university's central building (inaugurated 1880) and the adjacent newly constructed facilities for chemistry and physics a new cultural centre was established on what was then the border of the city. The decisive backer of this project was the last Grand Duke Ernst Ludwig, to whom the university bestowed out of thankfulness the honorary title of "Rector Magnificentissimus." In 1902 the student body surpassed one thousand. For the first time included in the student body were women, who since 1900 were admitted as guest students and starting in 1908 were admitted for regular study.

After the different Hessian states were (re-)united in 1929, both universities became public universities of that German state. The University of Giessen now has almost 23,000 students and 8,500 employees, which together with the Giessen students of Technische Hochschule Mittelhessen, makes Giessen the most student-dominated German city.

In December 2019 the university shut down all of its IT-servers after a "serious IT security incident". Hess State Prosecution Office investigated the case of a suspected hacker-attack.

Growth in the student population
Following is the growth in the student population of University of Giessen

In the 2014/2015 winter semester the student population exceeded the mark of more than a total of 28,000 students and 7,000 first-semester students for the first time. In the years 2019 to 2021 the student number was about 28,300, with a decrease to 27,400 students in the winter term 2021/2022 (probably due to COVID restrictions).

Faculties and departments

 Faculty 01 – Law
 Faculty 02 – Economics and Business Studies
 Faculty 03 – Social Sciences and Cultural Studies
 Faculty 04 – History and Cultural Studies
 Faculty 05 – Language, Literature, Culture
 Faculty 06 – Psychology and Sports Science
 Faculty 07 – Mathematics and Computer Science, Physics, Geography
 Faculty 08 – Biology and Chemistry
 Faculty 09 – Agricultural Sciences, Nutritional Sciences and Environmental Management
 Faculty 10 – Veterinary Medicine
 Faculty 11 – Medicine

Campus

Although the university has no defined campus, buildings and facilities are grouped together according to their subject areas and situated in various locations around Giessen. Philosophikum II, for example is an area on the outskirts of the city bordering the city forest. A number of faculty buildings and lecture theaters are located there, including Audimax, a building containing several lecture halls whose atrium is often the venue for concerts and disco nights, locally known as "Uni-Partys."

Student life

Myth 
Two law students of University of Giessen, Karl Siegfrieden (4 June 1822 – 10 March 1840) and Karl von Müller (10 June 1799 – 10 March 1840), are buried in a double grave at Alter Friedhof cemetery in Giessen. That both died on the same day sparked the myth that they had fought against each other in a duel. However, in 2008 the local newspaper Gießener Allgemeine Zeitung, referencing a 1939 chronicle of the fraternity Corps Teutonia zu Gießen which Karl von Müller co-founded, revealed that both students had died of typhus. Von Müller had contracted the disease while nursing his sick friend. The Corps buried both students after a torch-lit funeral procession.

Notable faculty and alumni

Next to Liebig, famous professors at the university included the physician Georg Haas (who carried out the world's first human hemodialysis in Giessen in 1924), the theologian Adolf von Harnack, the lawyer Rudolf von Jhering, the economist and statistician Etienne Laspeyres, the physicist Wilhelm Conrad Röntgen, the mathematicians Moritz Pasch and Alfred Clebsch, the gestalt psychologist Kurt Koffka, the philologist and archaeologist Friedrich Gottlieb Welcker, the orientalists Friedrich Schwally, Paul E. Kahle and Eberhard Schrader, and the president of Hebrew University of Jerusalem Benjamin Mazar.

Recent alumni in the area of politics include current President of Germany and former Vice Chancellor and Minister for Foreign Affairs Frank-Walter Steinmeier and Brigitte Zypries, current Federal Minister of Economic Affairs and Energy and former Federal Minister of Justice.

Notable alumni of the university include organic chemist August Kekulé, X-ray physicist Simone Techert, romantic dramatist and revolutionary Georg Büchner, literary and political historian Georg Gottfried Gervinus and botanist Johann Jacob Dillenius. Ernest Rutherford, the Rutherford's atomic model creator, studied in Giessen. Alumnus William Schlich founded Oxford University's forestry program. Carl A. Schenck, who received his PhD in forestry from Giessen, founded Biltmore Forest School, the first such school in the United States. Fitsum Assefa an Ethiopian teacher and politician who leads the FDRE Minister of Planning and Development. Also Hans-Joachim Preuss, former Secretary General of Welthungerhilfe and managing director of the  giz (gtz) graduated and worked at the University of Giessen.

Points of interest
 Akademischer Forstgarten Gießen
 Botanischer Garten Gießen, the university's historic botanical garden
 University Hospital of Giessen and Marburg

See also
 List of early modern universities in Europe

References

External links

 Scholars and Literati at the University of Gießen (1607–1800), Repertorium Eruditorum Totius Europae – RETE.

 
University of Giessen
Educational institutions established in the 1600s
History of forestry education
Forestry in Germany
1607 establishments in the Holy Roman Empire
Universities and colleges in Hesse